Ixanthus is a monotypic plant genus in  the family Gentianaceae. The sole species, Ixanthus viscosus, is endemic to Canary Islands laurel fields and  displays small yellow flowers when in bloom.

References

External links 
 Ixanthus viscosus -  at RarePlants

Gentianaceae
Gentianaceae genera
Monotypic Gentianales genera
Endemic flora of the Canary Islands